PC-File was a flat file database computer application most often run on DOS. It was one of the first of three widely popular software products sold via the marketing method that became known as shareware. It was originally written by Jim "Button" Knopf in late 1982, and he formed the company Buttonware to develop, market, and support it.

The program was usually distributed for the cost of diskettes by local PC user groups. There was no copy protection and a manual was distributed as a file on the same diskettes as the program. It was extremely simple to use and extremely stable. It ran on just about any PC, while competing commercial products costing hundreds of dollars were often picky and full of bugs.

Knopf originally wrote the software for his own use to manage a church mailing list, on an Apple II. Later, he ported it to CP/M, and then to DOS. Other people heard about it, and started requesting copies. Eventually, the cost of sending out update disks inspired Knopf to include a note requesting a small cash donation to offset the expenses. The response was overwhelming, and when his income from PC-File exceeded "ten times" what he was making from his job at IBM, he decided to turn Buttonware into a full-time business.

After PC-File version 3.0, Buttonware released PC-File/R, which had limited "relational" capabilities. In 1987, PC-File+ was rewritten to use the popular dBASE III file format.

PC-File for Windows v8 was published by Outlook Software / Ace Software (previously Good Software) in 1994. This version works on Windows 3.1, 95, 98, and XP, but uses the 8.3 file naming convention. PC File will not run on Windows 7 64 bit, even in the XP compatibility mode, but will run in 'XP Mode'.

Reception
In a 1984 review of databases, PC Magazine found that "quite a few ... rough edges" existed, but concluded that "on a performance/price basis, [PC-File III] may be the best money you'll ever spend".

See also
PC-Write
Bob Wallace
PC-Talk
Andrew Fluegelman

References

External links
Article about Jim "Button" Knopf, from Dr. Dobb's Journal

Shareware